John Tuttle  (born January 17, 1946 in Bryn Mawr, Pennsylvania) is an organist and choral conductor living in Toronto, Ontario, Canada.

He is currently director of music at Trinity College, Toronto, and professor of organ and university organist at the University of Toronto,. He is also the founding conductor and former artistic director of the Exultate Chamber Singers, and was organist and choirmaster at St. Thomas's Anglican Church from 1989 until his retirement in 2016.

He has recorded numerous albums with the Exultate Chamber Singers and the Canadian Children's Opera Company, including Derek Holman's Sir Christëmas (1989); A Choral Flourish (1991); Make We Joy! (1994); Stephen Chatman's Dandelion Parachutes (1993); Creatures Great and Small (1999); The Present Time (2001) and All Around the Circle (2005).

He received his B.Mus from the Curtis Institute of Music in Philadelphia, Pennsylvania, where he studied with Alexander McCurdy. In 2004 he was awarded a Doctor of Sacred Letters (honoris causa) from Trinity College, Toronto.

References

Further reading
 The Whole Note
 Gettysburg Times
 U of T Magazine
 St. Thomas's Anglican Church
 "Tuttle heads choral programs," Music Magazine, vol 12, no 5, Nov/Dec 1989
 "Sixteenth notes: John Tuttle receives honorary doctorate from University of Toronto," Organ Canada, vol 18, no 4, Dec 2005

1947 births
Canadian Anglicans
Canadian classical organists
Male classical organists
Canadian choral conductors
Fellows of the Royal College of Organists
Living people
Academic staff of the University of Toronto
People from Bryn Mawr, Pennsylvania
Musicians from Pennsylvania
Musicians from Toronto
21st-century Canadian conductors (music)
21st-century organists
21st-century Canadian male musicians